Spodnja Pristava is a small settlement in the Municipality of Slovenske Konjice in eastern Slovenia. It lies on the right bank of the Dravinja River just west of Draža Vas. The area is part of the traditional region of Styria and is now included in the Savinja Statistical Region.

References

External links
Spodnja Pristava at Geopedia

Populated places in the Municipality of Slovenske Konjice